Isunngua (old spelling: Isúngua) is a highland in the Qeqqata municipality in central-western Greenland, located immediately west of the Greenland Ice Sheet edge. In large part it is covered by the tundra, although in the immediate vicinity of the Sermersuaq ice sheet it gradually becomes exposed, barren, and largely devoid of life. The climate is polar continental, with the area receiving very little rainfall. Isunngua is a calving site for reindeer.

Geography 

The highland is bounded from the north by the Isunnguata Sermia glacier, from the south by Russell Glacier and Aajuitsup Tasia lake, and from the west by Sanningasoq twin lake. 

Both glaciers flow to the west from the ice sheet, which constrains Isunngua from the east. The highland is dotted with freshwater lakes, kettles, and meltwater outflow lakes saturated with glacial silt.

Road to the ice sheet 
In the spring of 2000 the Swedish construction group Skanska's Greenlandic subsidiary completed six months' work in establishing a  road for the testing company Nausta, which operates a testing site in northern Sweden. The road runs through the glacial valley of Akuliarusiarsuup Kuua, from Kangerlussuaq to the edge of the permanent inland ice in Isunngua. A road stretching  was laid on the inland ice. Nausta built the facility to complement the winter testing done by Volkswagen in northern Sweden and Finland.

The site at Kangerlussuaq was primarily used in the summer half of the year, from April through October. The entire testing ground was used to test cars' performance in extreme cold and conditions of near-zero friction. The cars were flown from Europe to Kangerlussuaq, and then driven to the proving grounds after last-minute checks. This project was abandoned and from 2006 the road leading to the edge of the ice cap is maintained for tourist purposes only, though access to the last segment of the road is limited and requires a key to open the padlocked gate. Ice activity has demolished the inland ice segment of the road, and it now ends in Isunngua, on the edge of the ice sheet.

Photographs

References 

Highlands of Greenland
Kangerlussuaq